Charles John Perry Keene (1846 – 29 November 1926) was a British archer who competed at the 1908 Summer Olympics in London. Keene entered the double York round event in 1908, taking tenth place with 543 points. His archery affiliations included the Devon and Cornwall Archery Society of Great Britain.

References

External links
 Charles Keene's profile at Sports Reference.com
 
 

1846 births
1926 deaths
British male archers
Olympic archers of Great Britain
Archers at the 1908 Summer Olympics
20th-century British people